Timothy Wanyonyi Wetangula is an industrious Kenyan lawyer and politician serving as a member of parliament representing the people of Westlands, Nairobi County. He was first elected as a councillor for the defunct Nairobi City Council in 2007 election, before being elected Westlands MP during 2013 elections and defended his seat in the 2017 and 2022 general elections held on 8 August 2017 and 9 August 2022 respectively. He is a half-brother to Moses Wetangula , the Speaker of the National Assembly of Kenya and former senator for Bungoma County. He is a member of the Orange Democratic Movement.

Wetangula founded the Kenya Paraplegic Organisation. He is in the Azimio la Umoja coalition movement that lost in the 2022 general elections.

Family and background
Wanyonyi, the seventh-born in his family, was brought up in Mukhweya village, Nalondo, Bungoma County. His father, Mzee Dominic Wetang'ula, is a retired teacher and a polygamist. They were brought up in abject poverty, a matter that forced Wanyonyi to repeat classes severally as he sacrificed for his other siblings to also achieve education.

His elder brother, Moses Wetangula, is the current speaker of the National Assembly of Kenya, and party leader of the Forum for the Restoration of Democracy – Kenya. His other siblings include Fred Wetangula who is a Nairobi-based businessman, the Late Tony Wetangula, and a younger sister, Emmeryncian Waswa.

Timothy Wetangula is married to Electina Naswa and they are blessed with three children, a son and twin girls Paulyne and Sophia.

References

Living people
Members of the 11th Parliament of Kenya
1963 births